Shaikh Inayat-Allah Kamboh (1608–1671) was a scholar, writer and historian. He was son of Mir Abdu-lla, Mushkin Kalam, whose title shows him to also have been a fine writer. Shaikh Inayat-Allah Kamboh was elder brother and teacher of Muhammad Saleh Kamboh, the famous historian of Shah Jahan's court and teacher of Mughal Emperor Aurangzeb. He died in 1671 AD at Delhi, and his Maqbara is located in Guband Kambohan wala on Empress Road near Railways Headquarters, Lahore.

Inayat-Allah Kamboh spent his early life in the military service of the Mughals and was a "Mir Munshi" (Inspector General) of Shah Jahan and held a mansab of 800 horses. But he after a period of service, he retired from the world and lived besides the sacred shrine of Qutb-ud-Din Bakhtiyar Kaki at Delhi. Like his brother Muhammad Saleh, Inayat-Allah is also stated to be an accomplished Hindi singer.

Inayat-Allah Kamboh wrote several historical works. He is most famous for his collection of tales entitled Bahar-i-Danish (Springtime of Knowledge), completed in 1651 AD, which became one of the most popular textbooks of Persian. Historian Muhammad Saleh Kamboh, younger brother of Inayat-Allah Kamboh, praised Bahar-i-Danish as a model of sophisticated workmanship. It became part of the syllabuses of Persian schools and is mentioned in a manuscript-copy of Khulasatul Makatib, written in 1688. From its popular use in Persian schools, educated men and women, both Muslims and Hindus, were commonly acquainted with it in Mughal India. During British rule too, according to education reports, it was taught in nearly all schools and its style and idiom were regarded as the best models of composition (Reid 1852: 54).

His another important work of Kamboh is the Takmilah-yi-Akbar-Namah which is a continuation of Abu-al-Fazl's Akbar-Namah and narrates the last four years of emperor Akbar's reign. He also wrote two more books known as Dalkasha  and Asharaf-al-Sarayaf.

See also
 Muhammad Saleh Kamboh

References

Historiography of India
17th-century Indian historians
Islamic rule in the Indian subcontinent
1608 births
1671 deaths
Writers from Uttar Pradesh